WLMA (channel 44) is a religious/secular independent television station in Lima, Ohio, United States. Owned by American Christian Television Services, the station maintains studios and transmitter facilities on Baty Road northwest of the city.

WTLW-LD (UHF channel 17, also mapped to virtual channel 44) in Lima operates as a translator of WLMA.

The station's owner should not be confused with the American Christian Television System, a defunct television network, or Associated Christian Television System, which owns WACX in Orlando, Florida.

History
WLMA has its roots in Christian radio station WTGN-FM, also in Lima. In 1976, WTGN solicited its listeners for seed money for a new television station. Before the station received FCC approval, however, WTGN opted not to own nor operate the new station, and the people behind the drive to get channel 44 on the air decided to incorporate as American Christian Television Services, Inc.

The station chose a hangar at the former site of Lima Allen County Airport on Baty Road near Elida, northwest of Lima, to build a studio. The hangar was converted into a television studio in 1980, through the efforts of volunteers.

On June 13, 1982, the station signed on the air as WTLW.

In 1988, the station expanded its focus from religious broadcasts to incorporate full length broadcasts of local high school basketball games. Eventually, football games were added as well. In the fall of 2010, WTLW launched a 24-hour all-sports network on its digital subchannel, 44.2. The station was called WOSN, standing for West Ohio Sports Network.

WOSN now covers 70 schools and several colleges and airs hundreds of full length sporting events throughout the year. WOSN is also home to several sports related shows – The Sports Report, Big Sports Weekend, Buckeye Insider and Marks Madness. The majority of games aired on WOSN are football and basketball contests, but soccer, volleyball, tennis, swimming, softball, baseball, track, bowling and even Soap Box Derby racing have been featured.

As a result of the 600 MHz spectrum auction, WTLW was required to move to VHF 4. The station then moved a low-powered translator (WTLW-LD) to its main tower as a nested translator to broadcast on UHF 17 at 15 kW of power, and became the temporary originating station for its signals (with a PSIP of 44.1 and 44.2) while WTLW moved frequencies. The station changed its call sign to WLMA on October 13, 2022, with WOIW-LD changing its call sign to WTLW-LD on October 17.

Programming
WLMA runs infomercials and religious programming before 5 p.m.; and family dramas, first-run talk shows, family movies, local sports programming, and reality shows after 5 p.m.

Technical information

Subchannels
The station's digital signal is multiplexed:

References

Television channels and stations established in 1982
1982 establishments in Ohio
LMA
Religious television stations in the United States